Venkatraman Lakshmibai is an Indian mathematician who is a professor emerita of mathematics at Northeastern University in Boston. Her research concerns algebraic geometry, the theory of algebraic groups, and representation theory, including in particular the theory of flag varieties and Schubert varieties.

Lakshmibai earned her PhD in 1976 from the Tata Institute of Fundamental Research.
With Sara Billey she is the co-author of the monograph Singular Loci of Schubert Varieties (Progress in Mathematics 182, Birkhäuser, 2000).
She has also co-authored two monographs with Justin Brown: Flag Varieties: An Interplay of Geometry, Combinatorics, and Representation Theory (Texts and Readings in Mathematics 53, Hindustan Book Agency, 2009) and The Grassmannian Variety: Geometric and Representation-Theoretic Aspects (Developments in Mathematics 42, Springer, 2015).

In 2012 she was selected as one of the inaugural fellows of the American Mathematical Society.

References

External links

Home page

Year of birth missing (living people)
Living people
Indian women mathematicians
20th-century American mathematicians
21st-century American mathematicians
Algebraic geometers
Northeastern University faculty
Fellows of the American Mathematical Society
Women scientists from Maharashtra
20th-century Indian mathematicians
20th-century women mathematicians
21st-century women mathematicians
Tata Institute of Fundamental Research alumni
20th-century Indian women